Barnstädt is a municipality in the Saalekreis district, Saxony-Anhalt, Germany. It is a member of the Verbandsgemeinde Weida-Land.

References

Saalekreis